Nikulinskoye is a rural locality (a selo) in Razinskoye Rural Settlement, Kharovsky District, Vologda Oblast, Russia. The population was 31 as of 2002.

Geography 
Nikulinskoye is located 44 km north of Kharovsk (the district's administrative centre) by road. Krasnaya Gorka is the nearest rural locality.

References 

Rural localities in Kharovsky District